Rychard Campeau (born April 9, 1952) is a Canadian former professional ice hockey defenceman.  He was drafted by the Buffalo Sabres of the National Hockey League in the fourth round, 53rd overall, of the 1972 NHL Entry Draft; however, he never played in that league. He played 82 regular-season games and four playoff games in the World Hockey Association with the Philadelphia Blazers and the Vancouver Blazers in the 1972–73 and 1973–74 seasons. As a youth, he and teammates Rick Lalonde and Denis Meloche played in the 1963 and 1964 Quebec International Pee-Wee Hockey Tournaments with minor ice hockey teams in Ville-Émard and Saint-Jean-de-Matha, Quebec.

Career statistics

References

External links

1952 births
Buffalo Sabres draft picks
Canadian ice hockey defencemen
Living people
Philadelphia Blazers players
Philadelphia Firebirds (NAHL) players
Roanoke Valley Rebels (SHL) players
Sorel Éperviers players
Ice hockey people from Montreal
Vancouver Blazers players